Central Coast Council may refer to:

 Central Coast Council (New South Wales), a local government area in New South Wales, Australia
 Central Coast Council (Tasmania), a local government area in Tasmania, Australia